Delfines de Los Cabos F.C. was a football club in Cabo San Lucas, Baja California Sur, Mexico, that played in the Segunda División Profesional.

See also
Football in Mexico

Football clubs in Baja California Sur
Association football clubs established in 2008
2008 establishments in Mexico
Cabo San Lucas